The 1994 Italian local elections were held on 12 and 26 June, on 20 November and 4 December. It was the first time for many municipalities  where citizens could vote both for the mayor and the city council.

The elections were won by the Democratic Party of the Left, led by Achille Occhetto and his centre-left to left-wing alliance. But the elections were also characterized by a strong aftermath of Forza Italia, the new centre-right party founded by media magnate Silvio Berlusconi.

Municipal elections

Mayoral election results

(*)Mayor directly elected who had been fired.

Provincial elections

Presidential election results

References

1994 elections in Italy
 
Municipal elections in Italy
June 1994 events in Europe